Dupont are an electronic music band from Sweden.

History
DuPont was formed as a collaboration of the vocalist Johan Damm and the electronic musicians Danucci and Riccardo in 1999. Following the demo 'Deliver', they signed with the German label Lip Records who released their first single 'Behave'. Their debut album 'Ukraina' was released in 2001. In 2002, Dupont supported Covenant on their 'Northern Light' tour.

There was a lengthy gap between their first and second albums, during which time Johan left the project to eventually be replaced on lead vocals by Riccardo, with the band's music moving in an electro-pop direction on their 2005 album 'Intermezzo'.  Their third album came out 2009 and is called "Entering the Ice Age".

Discography
Album: Behave
Catalogue No: Pain0001
Release date: 2000
Format: CDM

Album: Ukraina
Catalogue No: Pain0004
Release date: 2001
Format: CD

Album: Intermezzo
Catalogue No: Pain0009
Release date: 2005
Format: CD

Album: Entering the ice age
Catalogue No: PROCD020
Release date: 2009
Format: CD

Swedish synthpop groups
Electronic body music groups